The Nangang C3 Field is a parking lot, located in Taipei, Taiwan. It is used as a parking lot in regular day, but it is also used as a concert ground, several artists like Mayday, David Guetta, OneRepublic had held some concerts in this place. Cirque du Soleil also played several shows here.

Concerts

Cirque du Soleil

References 

 Music venues completed in 2016